Live @ ATP is a collection of songs recorded during the performance of Boards of Canada at All Tomorrow's Parties on 7 April 2001. These songs were later released onto P2P networks where they are still widely available. Along with a few known songs, the majority of the songs have never before been released and are unnamed.  This performance was not formally released by Boards of Canada.

Track listing
 "Echus"  – 6:23
 Unknown – 7:32
 "Flute Frum Thing" – 1:26
 "Sunshine Recorder" – 6:29
 "Sixtyten" – 5:51
 Unknown – 1:44
 Unknown (possibly "Noatak") – 8:26
 "Julie and Candy" – 6:14
 Unknown – 1:30
 "Happy Cycling" – 7:55
 "A Is To B As B Is To C"  – 0:46
 "In a Beautiful Place Out in the Country" – 5:46

References

2001 live albums
Bootleg recordings